Kenneth Lorrie Stirling is a New Zealand former rugby league footballer, coach and administrator who represented New Zealand in the 1975 World Championship.

Playing career
Stirling played for the Ellerslie club in the Auckland Rugby League and in 1971 won the Rothville Trophy as player of the year and the Bert Humphries Memorial as most improved back. He made his debut for the New Zealand national rugby league team that same year and went on to play in 22 Test matches, scoring four tries. Stirling would have played in more Test matches if it was not for injury, he missed the 1972 World Cup and retired from international football in 1976 before returning in 1978. In total he played in 43 matches for the Kiwis.

Stirling was an Auckland representative and won the New Zealand Rugby League Player of the Year award in 1974.

Stirling was appointed the Kiwis captain in 1974 and continued in the role during the 1975 World Championship and in 1978.

Later years
After retirement Stirling coached Ellerslie. In 1982 Stirling helped found the Hibiscus Coast Raiders club and served on their foundation committee.

In 1988 Stirling was elected onto the New Zealand Rugby League board, serving a four-year term. He later served another four-year term and was also the convenor of selectors for the national side.

Stirling was inducted into the New Zealand Rugby League's Legends of League in 2007.

Family
Stirling's father, Ivor, also represented New Zealand in rugby league. His sister, Glenda, represented New Zealand in swimming at the 1968 Summer Olympics and he is related to New Zealand former cricket captain Daniel Vettori.

References

Living people
New Zealand rugby league players
New Zealand national rugby league team players
Auckland rugby league team players
Ellerslie Eagles players
Rugby league halfbacks
New Zealand national rugby league team captains
Ellerslie Eagles coaches
New Zealand rugby league coaches
New Zealand rugby league administrators
Hibiscus Coast Raiders
New Zealand Rugby League board members
Year of birth missing (living people)